Shotgun is the only studio album by British musician Jamie J. Morgan, released in 1990 on Tabu Records. It includes production by Nellee Hooper, Cameron McVey, Tim Simenon, DJ Mushroom from Massive Attack and Richard Mazda.

Single releases
The album includes a cover of Lou Reed's "Walk on the Wild Side" which was released as a single, reaching number one in New Zealand, number 25 in Australia, number 22 in Ireland and number 27 in the United Kingdom. "Rocksteady" was also released as a single, reaching number 97 in the UK.

Track listing

Note
 Tracks 11–13 available on CD and cassette versions only.

Personnel
Credits adapted from the album's liner notes.

Musicians

 Joe Crisp – percussion
 DJ Lawrence – backing vocals
 DJ Mushroom – backing vocals
 Finesse & Sinquis – rap (track 2)
 Claudia Fontaine – backing vocals
 Ivor Guest – keyboards
 D. Johnston – drumming
 Pachiri Johnson – percussion
 Jomanda – backing vocals
 Eric Kupper – keyboards
 Richard Mazda – guitar, backing vocals
 Cindy Mizelle – backing vocals
 Sean Oliver – guitar, bass guitar on "Shotgun"
 Lawrence Parry – trumpet
 Paul Pesco – guitar
 P. Scott – keyboards
 Tim Simenon – backing vocals
 Beverley Skeete – backing vocals
 Bruce Smith – drums on "Shotgun"
 Naomi Thompson – backing vocals
 Caron Wheeler – backing vocals
 Fred Wesley – brass

Production

 Jeremy Allon – mix engineer
 Phil Chill – programming, drum programming, production
 Pete Davies – production
 DJ Mushroom – production
 Gota – programming
 Nigel Green – mixing 
 Ivor Guest – programming 
 Nellee Hooper – programming, production
 Ascar Key – engineer
 Phil Legg – engineer
 Richard Mazda – programming, drum programming, arranger, mixing, production
 Dennis Mitchell – engineering
 David Morales – remix
 Sean Oliver – programming, production
 Kevin Petri – engineering
 John Poppo – engineering
 Sam Sever – production, programming
 Tim Simenon – programming, production, arranger
 Bruce Smith – programming
 Gary Wilkinson – mixing
 Recorded at Matrix Studios, London; Unique, New York; D&D, New York; Electric Lady, New York; Re Maximum Studios, London; Beethoven, London; Sarm West, London
 Executive producers: Adam Kidron, Julian Woolley
 Mixed at Battery Studios, London
 Photography: Jean-Baptiste Mondino
 Design: Neville Brody, Ian Swift

References

External links
Shotgun at Discogs

1990 debut albums
Tabu Records albums
Albums produced by Nellee Hooper
Albums produced by Cameron McVey
Albums produced by Tim Simenon
Albums produced by Richard Mazda
Albums recorded at Electric Lady Studios